Tommy Mosquera Korean: 토미; born is a 27 September 1976 in Colombia) is a Colombian retired footballer.

Club career

References

External links

Colombian footballers
Living people
Association football forwards
1976 births
Busan IPark players
K League 1 players